The Schlaube is a river in the district Oder-Spree, Brandenburg, Germany. It is in the Schlaube Valley Nature Park and flows more than  through the Schlaube-Valley (German: Schlaubetal), a tunnel valley of the last glacial period.

Its source is east of Groß Muckrow (part of Friedland) in the Wirchenberge (hill). After passing some lakes, including the Großer Müllroser See, the Schlaube ends in Müllrose into the Kleiner Müllroser See, which is connected with the Oder-Spree Canal.

See also
List of rivers of Brandenburg

Rivers of Brandenburg
Rivers of Germany